Horace Henry Alfred "Ossie" Pickworth (17 January 1918 – 23 September 1969) was a leading Australian professional golfer of the 1940s and 1950s, winner of three successive Australian Open titles from 1946 to 1948, the last of which came in a playoff against Jim Ferrier.

Pickworth was born in Sydney.

Unlike his contemporary Ferrier, who would enjoy great success on the U.S. PGA Tour, Pickworth travelled to play only infrequently, but when he did it was with some success - he played the British circuit in 1950 and finished third in the Order of Merit after winning the Irish Open, losing a three-way playoff for the Daily Mail Tournament and being runner-up in the Silver King Tournament.

Pickworth would collect a fourth Australian Open title in 1954, and was also a three-time winner of the Australian PGA Championship, in 1947, 1953 and 1955, among numerous professional victories on the Australian circuit.

Tournament wins (36)
this list may be incomplete
1946 Australian Open
1947 Australian Open, Australian PGA Championship, Ampol Tournament, Lakes Open, Dunlop Cup (Victoria)
1948 Australian Open, Victorian PGA Championship, Ampol Tournament (Apr), Ampol Tournament (Nov), Western Australian Open, Adelaide Advertiser Tournament, Victorian Close Championship, Dunlop Cup (Victoria), Peninsula £100 Pro Purse
1949 Ampol Tournament, Victoria Park Pro Purse, Dunlop Cup (Victoria)
1950 Irish Open, Victorian Close Championship, Dunlop Cup (Victoria)
1951 Ampol Tournament, Queensland Open, Dunlop Cup (Victoria)
1952 Queensland Open, Dunlop Cup (Victoria) (tie with Peter Thomson)
1953 Australian PGA Championship, Ampol Tournament
1954 Australian Open, Victorian PGA Championship, Victorian Close Championship, Liquor Industry £100 Tournament
1955 Australian PGA Championship, Victorian PGA Championship, Victorian Close Championship
1956 Victorian PGA Championship
1957 Victorian Open

Results in major championships

Note: Pickworth only played in The Open Championship.

CUT = missed the half-way cut

Team appearances
Canada Cup (representing Australia): 1953
Lakes International Cup (representing Australia): 1952, 1954 (winners)
Vicars Shield (representing New South Wales): 1946 (winners)
Vicars Shield (representing Victoria): 1947, 1948, 1949, 1951 (winners), 1952 (winners), 1953 (winners), 1954, 1955

References

Alliss, Peter: "The Who's Who of Golf" (1983), Orbis Publishing Ltd. .

External links
Australian Dictionary of Biography profile
Barrier Daily Truth article 3.9.1949

Australian male golfers
1918 births
1969 deaths